The 2016–17 UAB Blazers basketball team represented the University of Alabama at Birmingham during the 2016–17 NCAA Division I men's basketball season. The Blazers, led by first-year head coach Robert Ehsan, played their home games at the Bartow Arena as members of Conference USA. They finished the season 17–16, 9–9 in C-USA play to finish in a tie for seventh place. They defeated Charlotte in the first round of the C-USA tournament before losing to Louisiana Tech.

Previous season
The Blazers finished the 2015–16 season 26–7, 16–2 in C-USA play to win the regular season championship. They lost in the quarterfinals of the C-USA tournament to WKU. As a regular season conference champion who failed to win their conference tournament, they received an automatic bid to the National Invitation Tournament where they lost in the first round to BYU.

Following the season, head coach Jerod Haase left UAB to accept the head coaching position at Stanford. On April 4, 2016, the school hired Robert Ehsan, who had been an assistant under Haase at UAB, as head coach .

Preseason 
The Blazers were picked to finish in first place in the preseason Conference USA poll. Chris Cokley and William Lee were selected to the preseason All-Conference USA team.

Departures

Incoming recruits

Roster

Schedule and results
 
|-
!colspan=9 style=|Exhibition

|-
!colspan=9 style=| Non-conference regular season

|-
!colspan=12 style=| Conference USA regular season

|-
!colspan=9 style=| Conference USA tournament

References

UAB Blazers men's basketball seasons
UAB
UAB Blazers men's basketball
UAB Blazers men's basketball